Diaphus signatus, the small lanternfish, is a species of lanternfish found in the Indo-Pacific.

Size

References

Myctophidae
Taxa named by Charles Henry Gilbert
Fish described in 1908